Dano is both a surname and a given name. Dano is of Xhosa origin and means "He Who The Sun Praises". Notable people with the name include:

Surname:
Linda Dano (born 1943), American actress
Paul Dano (born 1984), American actor and producer
Royal Dano (1922–1994), American actor

Given name:
Dano Halsall (born 1963), Swiss former swimmer
Dano Pantić (born 1972), Serbian judoka
Dano Raffanti (born 1948), Italian operatic tenor